Balzer Peter Vahl (28 August 1718 in Lassan – 1792) was burgomaster of Greifswald. He founded the Greifswald merchant family Wahl

He became a merchant on 18 April 1744 in the first estate citizens of Greifswald. In 1755 he became member of the town council and from 1762 the city's treasurer. From 1785 he was the third mayor and held this office until his death in 1792. He supervised the deconstruction decided by the city council in 1782 and the transformation of parts of the  into a green area (Wallpromenade).

He was married to Christine Elisabeth Venthien (1723-1782). Beside several daughters, das Ehepaar had two sons: Gottfried Michael (1748-1811) and Balzer Peter.

Further reading 
 Bericht des literarisch-geselligen Vereins zu Stralsund über sein Bestehen während der Jahre 1860 und 1861. Hingstsche Buchhandlung, Stralsund 1862,  (Google books).
 Heinrich Berghaus: Landbuch des Herzogthums Pommern und des Fürstenthums Rügen. part 4, vol. 1, W. Dietze, Anklam 1866,  (numerised).
 Heiko Schäfer: Bemerkenswerte Funde aus dem frühen 14. Jahrhundert vom Grundstück Markt 12 in Greifswald. In  (edit.): . Neue Folge vol. 81, N. G. Elwert, Marburg 1995,  (numerised).

References 

German merchants
1718 births
1792 deaths
People from Mecklenburg